Uluborlu is a town and district of Isparta Province in the Mediterranean region of Turkey. The population was 6,385 in 2010.

History
Throughout history, Uluborlu has been on the military and commercial crossroads of  Asia minor which has shaped its character.

Settlement is known from prehistoric times and in early historic times was part of Phrygia which fell to Alexander the Great in the 330s BC.  Following Alexanders death it passed to the  Asian arm of the Seleucid Empire and then the Kingdom of Pergamon (188-133 BC) for 130 years, when it was ceded to the Romans and formed part of the province of Cilicia until the division of the Byzantine Empire in 395 AD, when it was known as Apollonia
In 1074 Uluborlu passed into the hands of the Seljuk Turks but  in the years 1119-1120 returned to Byzantine control. 
In 1403 Timur seized the city and the men in the town were killed as retribution for their defence of the city, the women and children were taken captive.

During the Ottoman period  of  the 15th and 16th centuries Uluborlu prospered and supported the new dynasty.  
Hamid Sanjak held the first census of Uluborlu in 1831 and in 1911 Uluborlu suffered a  great fire, In 1963 the municipality of Uluborlu was established.

Economy
Agriculture dominated the economy of the town. Especially known for its cherry production but apples, quince, and pears are also grown, with Britain, Germany, the Netherlands and Belgium the main markets.
Tourism is also a growing industry with spectators coming to the annual wrestling festival.

See also
Uluborlu Dam

References

External links
 District governor's official website 
 District municipality's official website 

Populated places in Isparta Province
Districts of Isparta Province
Towns in Turkey